Bartholomew of Parma (Latin: Bartolomeus de Parma) was the first recorded lecturer on astronomy at the University of Bologna, active in the 1280s and 1290s. He was the author of a Tractatus spherae (Treatise of the Spheres), and acquired a reputation as an astrologer and geomancer.

Geomancy, one of his main interests, he described as the practical side or ‘little daughter’ of the art of astrology, and also as ‚another astrology‘: ‚Note that in this art every point is deposited according to a star of the heavens. Every figure is deposited according to a certain element in the order of the four elements. Similarly every figure is deposited according to the sign of the star among the twelve signs of the heavens, a planet and the part of the world, which are 4: east, west, south and north. Geomancy is nothing other than ‘another astrology’ (altra astrologia.')

Of Astrology, considered an "art" in 13th century Italy, feudal princes wanted to know their civic "fortune". Works by astrologers such as Bartholomew of Parma's Treatise of the Spheres were considered invaluable as they described how the information gained from celestial movement could be interpreted to guide civic leaders and maintain governance over the Italian city states.)

References

13th-century Italian astronomers
13th-century Latin writers
13th-century Italian writers